Headfort may refer to:

 Marquess of Headfort, a title in the Irish peerage
 Headfort (house) (sometimes called 'Headfort House'), a stately home and former boarding school in County Meath, Ireland